Urban John Vehr (May 30, 1891 – September 19, 1973) was an American prelate of the Roman Catholic Church. He served as bishop of the Diocese of Denver from 1931 to 1941.  In 1941, he became the first archbishop of the new Archdiocese of Denver, serving in that post until 1967.

Biography

Early life 
The oldest of six children, Urban Vehr was born in the Price Hill section of Cincinnati, Ohio, to Anthony and Catharine (née Hamann) Vehr. His father was a mechanical engineer. After graduating from St. Xavier College in Cincinnati, Urban Vehr studied theology at Mount St. Mary's Seminary of the West in the same city.

Priesthood 
Vehr was ordained to the priesthood for the Archdiocese of Cincinnati by Archbishop Henry K. Moeller on May 29, 1915. After his ordination, Vehr was assigned as a curate at Holy Trinity Parish in Middletown, Ohio.  He was transferred in 1923 to the College of Mount St. Joseph in Cincinnati to serve as its chaplain.

In 1924, Vehr earned a Master of Education degree from the Catholic University of America in Washington, D.C.  After his return to Cincinnati, he was appointed superintendent of the Catholic schools in the archdiocese. Vehr was appointed d as rector of St. Gregory Minor Seminary in Cincinnati in 1927 was raised to the rank of monsignor. 

Vehr was sent to Rome to study at the Pontifical University of St. Thomas Aquinas, receiving a Licentiate of Canon Law in 1928. After his return from Rome, he served from 1930 to 1931,  as rector of Mount St. Mary's Seminary.

Bishop of Denver 
On April 17, 1931, Vehr was appointed the fourth bishop of the Diocese of Denver by Pope Pius XI. He received his episcopal consecration on June 10, 1931, from Archbishop John T. McNicholas, with Archbishop Francis Beckman and Bishop Joseph H. Albers serving as co-consecrators. At age 40, he was the youngest Catholic bishop in the United States. He was installed at the Cathedral of the Immaculate Conception on July 16, 1931. 

Vehr soon visited every parish in the diocese, wearing out the new Studebaker automobile given to him by his clergy. The number of parishes fell from 111 in 1930 to 87 in 1940 due to the Great Depression. Vehr cooperated with the New Deal programs of President Franklin D. Roosevelt, asking priests to celebrate mass at the two dozen Civilian Conservation Corps camps established in Colorado. He reorganized diocesan affairs and placed ownership of all parish properties in the name of the bishop.

Archbishop of Denver 
On November 15, 1941, Pope Pius XII raised the Diocese of Denver to the Archdiocese of Denver and appointed Vehr as its first Archbishop. He was installed on January 6, 1942; one attendee was Monsignor Giovanni Battista Montini (the future Pope Paul VI), who stayed in Vehr's residence. Due to World War II, Vehr did not receive his pallium, a vestment worn by metropolitan bishops, until April 1946, when he received it from Cardinal Samuel Stritch. 

Vehr was named as an assistant at the pontifical throne in 1955. Under the slogan of "Every Catholic Child in a Catholic School," he began a fundraising campaign to raise $3.5 million to acquire school sites and make additions to existing ones. In 1965, Vehr launched the Archdiocesan Development Program to accommodate Colorado's Catholic population, which had tripled in size since his arrival in 1931. He also erected 43 new parishes and expanded St. Thomas Seminary, which reached its peak enrollment of 274 seminarians during Vehr's tenure. Due to poor health, Vehr did not attend the Second Vatican Council sessions in Rome (1962-1965), but sent Auxiliary Bishop David Maloney instead.

Retirement and legacy 
On February 18, 1967, Pope Paul VI accepted Vehr's resignation as archbishop of the Archdiocese of Denver and appointed him  titular archbishop of Masuccaba. He resigned his titular see on December 31, 1970.

Urban Vehr died in Denver on September 19, 1973 at age 82. He is buried at Mount Olivet Cemetery in Wheat Ridge, Colorado.

References

1891 births
1973 deaths
Religious leaders from Cincinnati
Roman Catholic Archdiocese of Cincinnati
Roman Catholic bishops of Denver
Roman Catholic archbishops of Denver
20th-century Roman Catholic archbishops in the United States
Xavier University alumni
The Athenaeum of Ohio alumni
Catholic University of America alumni
Mount St. Joseph University
Burials in Colorado